Udal is a 2022 Indian Malayalam-language drama thriller film written and directed by Ratheesh Raghunandan and produced by Gokulam Gopalan. The film stars Dhyan Sreenivasan alongside Durga Krishna and Indrans. In the film, Already a housewife and a mother, Shiny is sick of the prevailing circumstances at her father-in-law's home. When the home nurse tending to his bed-ridden wife leaves, Shiny has to take over.

Udal was theatrically released on 20 May 2022.

Premise
Shiny is looking after her bedridden mother-in-law, living along with her father-in-law Kuttichan. Her husband is away for work. Her only relief was spending time with her college mate Kiran. One night, when kiran was visiting her things got out of their control. Tensions arise pushing Shiny to the point where she cannot take anymore.

Cast 
 Dhyan Sreenivasan as Kiran
 Indrans as Kuttichayan
 Durga Krishna as Shyni 
 Jude Anthany Joseph as Reji (Shyni's Husband)
 Master Kannan as Jerin (Shyni's Son)
 Anjana Appukkuttan as Reena

Release 
Udal was theatrically released on 20 May 2022.

Reception 
A critic from The Times of India rated Udal 3 out of 5 stars and wrote "Udal is definitely worth a watch". Sajin Shrijith from Cinema Express rated Udal 3.5 out of 5 stars and wrote "The ambition of Udal, however, is more in line with James Hadley Chase than Raymond Chandler or James M Cain. It has the finesse of a small airport novel you read and then forget. But it's a decent effort, nevertheless. In the midst of its overwhelming darkness, Udal also finds some time for dark humour." Shilpa S from OTTPlay rated Udal 2 out of 5 and wrote "Although Udal boasts of the talents of stars such as Indrans and Dhyan Sreenivasan, Ratheesh Reghunandan fails to weave a compelling narrative out of the claustrophobic thriller." Sangeetha KS from Samayam rated Udal 4 out of 5 and wrote "The film fills in as a seat-edge thriller beyond the family drama. Throughout the film, the scenes are taken to another level, shattering the audience's guessing what will happen in the next moment. The film received an A certificate for its sexually explicit content, obscene language, and violent scenes. It is better to watch movies without children."

References

External links 

Indian thriller films
2020s Malayalam-language films